Rebecca L. Hankins is the Africana Resources Librarian/Curator at Texas A&M University, whose research interests include women's and gender studies, Middle Eastern studies, the African diaspora, and Islam in science fiction and popular culture.

Biography 
Hankins graduated cum laude from Loyola University and earned her master's degree at Louisiana State University.

Hankins worked as the Assistant Librarian and Archivist at the University of Arizona and the Archivist of the Amistad Research Center at Tulane University. In 2003, she joined the faculty of Texas A&M University as an Associate Professor and Archivist/Librarian/Curator for Africana Studies. She is the author of numerous articles and chapters and co-editor (with Miguel Juarez) of Where are all the Librarians of Color? The Experiences of People of Color in Academia (2016).

Hankins is a Regent for Exam Development for the Academy of Certified Archivists. She was honored as a 2016 Fellow of the Society of American Archivists for her services to the archival profession and the Society.

In December 2016, President Obama appointed Hankins as a member of the National Historical Publications and Records Commission.

References

Year of birth missing (living people)
Living people
Female archivists
Fellows of the Society of American Archivists
Loyola University New Orleans alumni
Louisiana State University alumni
American women librarians
American librarians
Academic librarians